The Richard Wilbur Award is an American poetry award and publishing prize given by University of Evansville in Indiana. It is named in honor of the American poet Richard Wilbur and was established by William Baer, a professor at the University of Evansville. This biennial competition (awarded in even-numbered years) amongst all American poets awards publication of the winning manuscript by the University of Evansville Press and a small monetary prize.

Open to all American poets, except previous Wilbur Award winners, the contest is "[n]amed in honor of the distinguished American poet Richard Wilbur, and welcomes submissions of unpublished, original poetry collections (public domain or permission-secured translations may comprise up to one-third of the manuscript). ... Winning manuscripts will reflect the thoughtful humanity and careful metrical craftsmanship of Richard Wilbur's poetry."  The 2019 contest is being judged by Ned Balbo.  The award has an entry fee of $25 per manuscript, and the prize is $1000 plus publication. After the retirement of Dr. William Baer in 2015, Professor Rob Griffith became of the director of the competition.

The submissions are judged without knowing the identity of the contributors.

NPR journalist Michel Martin called it a "prestigious award". Journalist Julie Gunter in National Catholic Reporter considered the award to be "coveted".

The annual competition is conducted by The University of Evansville, is considered "prestigious", and attracts top shelf poets as judges.

Winners
Source 1998-2007:

References

Notes

Citations

Bibliography, Richard Wilbur Series Award books in chronological order

 

American poetry awards
Awards established in 1998
University of Evansville
Writing contests